HMCS Burlington (pennant J250) was a  constructed for the Royal Canadian Navy during the Second World War. The minesweeper entered service in 1941 and took part in the Battle of the Atlantic and the Battle of the St. Lawrence as a convoy escort. The ship was decommissioned in 1945 and sold in 1946. The vessel was broken up for scrap in 1946.

Design and description
They came in two versions powered by different engines; those with a diesel engines and those with vertical triple-expansion steam engines. Burlington was of the latter design and was larger than her diesel-engined cousins. She had a complement of 6 officers and 77 enlisted.

Burlington had two vertical triple-expansion steam engines, each driving one shaft, using steam provided by two Admiralty three-drum boilers.

The minesweeper was armed initially with a single quick-firing (QF) /40 caliber Mk IV gun mounted forward that was later replaced with a single QF  20 cwt gun mounted forward. The ship was also fitted with a QF 2-pounder Mark VIII aft and was eventually fitted with single-mounted QF 20 mm Oerlikon guns on the bridge wings. Those ships assigned to convoy duty were armed with two depth charge launchers and four chutes to deploy their 40 depth charges.

Operational history
The minesweeper was ordered as part of the 1939–40 building programme. The ship's keel was laid down on 4 July 1940 by Dufferin Shipbuilding at their yard in Toronto, Ontario. Burlington was launched on 23 November 1940 and commissioned into the Royal Canadian Navy on 6 September 1941 at Toronto.

The ship arrived at Halifax, Nova Scotia in September 1941 and remained part of the local force until March 1942 when Burlington transferred to the Western Local Escort Force (WLEF) as a convoy escort in the Battle of the Atlantic. Burlington and sister ship  were sent to aid the stricken. While Red Deer aided the survivors, Burlington unsuccessfully searched for the submarine.

In May 1942, the minesweeper was reassigned to the Gulf Escort Force, escorting convoys through the Gulf of St. Lawrence. Burlington, with the corvette  and sister ship , escorted the first Quebec – Sydney convoy, QS 1, through the gulf. Following the closure of the St. Lawrence River and the Gulf of St. Lawrence to shipping in September following a series of successful U-boat attacks, a special convoy comprising twelve merchants was escorted by Burlington and Red Deer sailed from Sydney to Quebec City. The convoy avoided the main shipping lanes and arrived safely. The successful sailing of this convoy and its sequel gave the Royal Canadian Navy the confidence to reopen the gulf to merchant shipping again in October. The convoy was escorted by Burlington,  and two Fairmile motor launches. The submarine was damaged in a counterattack by Gananoque and forced to break off its attack. On 6 November, the minesweeper was sent to search for a U-boat that had landed an Abwehr agent in Quebec. The agent was captured but the submarine was not intercepted.

In December 1942, Burlington began a refit that was done piecemeal at Halifax, Lunenburg, Nova Scotia and Dartmouth, Nova Scotia that took until May 1943 to complete. After working up, the minesweeper was assigned to WLEF, joining the convoy escort group W9. Burlington remained with the group until February 1944 when she transferred to the Halifax Local Defence Force as a local patrol and escort vessel.

In October 1944, Burlington joined Newfoundland Force operating from St. John's, Newfoundland, remaining with the unit until 8 June 1945 when it was disbanded. The minesweeper was then assigned miscellaneous duties until being paid off on 30 October 1945. Following the war, the minesweeper was sold to T. Harris of New Jersey in 1946 and broken up for scrap.

References

Notes

Citations

Sources

External links
 
 

 

Bangor-class minesweepers of the Royal Canadian Navy
Ships built in Ontario
1940 ships
World War II minesweepers of Canada